Leptogorgia capensis is a species of sea fan in the family Gorgoniidae. It was described by Sydney John Hickson in 1900. It occurs on the coast of South Africa, in the extreme east of the Atlantic Ocean and in the western Indian Ocean.

References

Gorgoniidae
Cnidarians of the Atlantic Ocean
Cnidarians of the Indian Ocean
Endemic fauna of South Africa
Animals described in 1900